Bakonyszentkirály is a village in Veszprém county, Hungary in Zirc District.
It is a small village with a population of 826. The village is situated in the Bakony mountains, some 40 km south of Győr and 50 km north of Lake Balaton.

The quiet, forested area surrounding Bakonyszentkirály, with its fresh air, is ideal for tourism.

Neighboring villages 
 Csesznek
 Bakonyoszlop
 Bakonyszentlászló
 Veszprémvarsány

Gallery

Notes

External links 
 Village Website (Hungarian)
 Hostel site with pictures

Populated places in Zirc District